Goodbye Enemy Airship the Landlord Is Dead is the second studio album by the Canadian post-rock band Do Make Say Think. It was released on March 13, 2000 in Europe and March 23, 2000 worldwide. The record was published through the influential Montreal-based record label, Constellation Records.

"The Apartment Song" and "Goodbye Enemy Airship", were recorded in 1998 at CIUT-FM studios at the University of Toronto, the same place where the group's eponymous debut album was recorded. The remaining songs were recorded in 1999 at a barn near Port Hope, Ontario owned by keyboardist Jason McKenzie's grandparents. The venue imbued the record with a lofty, nighttime ambiance complete with crickets chirping.

Track listing

Personnel

Do Make Say Think

 Ohad Benchetrit – guitar, bass, saxophone, flute
 Jason McKenzie – keyboards, effects
 Dave Mitchel – drums
 James Payment – drums
 Justin Small – guitar
 Charles Spearin – guitar, bass, trumpet

Production

 Do Make Say Think – producer
 Ohad Benchetrit – mixing, mastering
 Charles Spearin – mixing, mastering
 Stephanie Small – cover photograph
 Aaron Pocock – insert and sleeve photography

Notes

External links 
 Constellation Records' Official Homepage

2000 albums
Constellation Records (Canada) albums
Do Make Say Think albums